, son of regent Tadaie, was a kugyō or Japanese court noble of the Kamakura period. He held a regent position kampaku from 1291 to 1293. Moronori and Fusazane were his sons.

Family
 Father: Kujō Tadaie
 Mother: Sanjō Kinfusa’s daughter
 Wife and Children:
 Wife: Saionji Kinsuke‘s daughter
 Kujō Moronori
 Wife: Fujiwara Aritoki’s daughter
 Kujō Fusazane
 Wife: Nijō Michinaga‘s daughter
 unknown:
 Nijo Baishi married Nijō Kanemoto
 Kujo Motonari
 Sokaku
 Kyokan

References
 

1248 births
1332 deaths
Fujiwara clan
Kujō family
People of Kamakura-period Japan